Beryllophantis asticta is a species of moth of the family Tortricidae. It is found in Papua New Guinea. The habitat consists of montane rain forests.

The wingspan is about 15 mm. The forewings are pale light green, mottled with darker, duller green and suffused with pale ochrous in the distal part of the wing. There are scattered dark fuscous scales and strigulae throughout wing and the markings are ill-defined, forming indistinct median and subterminal fasciae. The hindwings are pale grey, indistinctly mottled with darker greyish brown.

References

Moths described in 1979
Tortricini
Moths of Papua New Guinea
Taxa named by Marianne Horak